Skyfall: Original Motion Picture Soundtrack is the soundtrack album to the 23rd James Bond film of the same name. Released by Sony Classical on 29 October 2012 in the United Kingdom and on 6 November 2012 in the United States, the music was composed by Thomas Newman. This is Newman's first Bond soundtrack, making him the ninth composer to score a Bond film. The score won the BAFTA Award for Best Film Music. In 2013, it became one of two Bond scores to be nominated for the Academy Award for Best Original Score. The other to be nominated was the score from The Spy Who Loved Me (1977).

Development
Producers Michael G. Wilson and Barbara Broccoli announced on 9 January 2012 that Thomas Newman, frequent collaborator of Skyfall director Sam Mendes, would score Skyfall. On describing how the job became his, Newman said, "I very shyly gave [Mendes] a call or emailed him and said, just so you know, I’d be overjoyed to do it, but would never want to be presumptuous. He emailed me back, saying I was just about to call you, let’s meet for lunch!" Newman took over musical duties for the film from David Arnold who was busy directing the musical aspects of the 2012 London Olympic and Paralympic closing ceremonies. However, Arnold later commented that the reason behind the selection of Newman had been because of his past work with Mendes. Newman's collaborator J. A. C. Redford did the orchestration.

On 6 October 2012, the album's track list was revealed featuring the running times of each track. The first preview of the score was released a few days later on 9 October 2012, while the soundtrack itself was released less than a month later by Sony Classical. This was the second time the label had released a Bond soundtrack, with the first being the Casino Royale soundtrack album.

Unlike most other Bond soundtracks, the soundtrack album to Skyfall does not contain the title song performed by Adele. This marks only the second time that this has happened, the first being the Casino Royale soundtrack album. Despite this, at the producer's insistence Newman added an interpolation of "Skyfall" in the track "Komodo Dragon", used in a scene where Bond enters a casino in Macau.

The CD booklet mentions that the score contains interpolations of the "James Bond Theme", written by Monty Norman. Arnold's arrangement of the "James Bond Theme" (which appears on the Casino Royale soundtrack as "The Name's Bond…James Bond") plays over Skyfall'''s end titles (which begin with the film's gun barrel sequence); however, the track does not appear on the soundtrack album. Newman's arrangement of the theme plays over the reveal of Bond's Aston Martin and his escape with M to Scotland; the track appears on the album as "Breadcrumbs".Boum !'' by the French singer Charles Trenetl featured in the execution scene on the island, but was not included in the soundtrack.

Track listing

Charts

See also
 James Bond music
 Outline of James Bond

References

External links

Soundtrack albums from James Bond films
Thomas Newman albums
2012 soundtrack albums
2010s film soundtrack albums
Skyfall